The Creator economy or also known as influencer economy, is a software-facilitated economy that allows creators and influencers to earn revenue from their creations. Examples of creator economy software platforms include YouTube, TikTok, Instagram, Facebook, Twitch, Spotify, Substack, OnlyFans, Tiki and Patreon.

History 
In 1997, Stanford University's Paul Saffo suggested that the creator economy first came into being in 1997 as the "new economy". Early creators in that economy worked with animations and illustrations, but at the time there was no available marketplace infrastructure to enable them to generate revenue.

The term "creator" was coined by YouTube in 2011 to be used instead of "YouTube star", an expression that at the time could only apply to famous individuals on the platform. The term has since become omnipresent and is used to describe anyone creating any form of online content.

The creator economy consists of approximately 50 million content creators, and there are just over 2 million who are able to make a career of it. The biggest names are those such as TikTok star Charli D'Amelio, PewDiePie and Addison Rae.

A number of platforms such as TikTok, Snapchat, YouTube, Tiki and Facebook have set up funds with which to pay creators.

Criticism
The large majority of content creators derive no monetary gain for their creations, with most of the benefits accruing to the platforms who can make significant revenues from their uploads. Despite the hopes of many who aspire to make content creation a full time job, as few as 0.1% are able to make a living of it.

See also 
 Content creation
 Content marketing
 Cultural technology
 Hype (marketing)
 Influence-for-hire
 Influencer marketing
 Social media marketing
 Viral marketing

References 

Social media
 
Information Age